The  (‘shrine of Voltumna’) was the chief sanctuary of the Etruscans; fanum means a sacred place, a much broader notion than a single temple. Numerous sources refer to a league of the "Twelve Peoples" (lucumonies) of Etruria, formed for religious purposes but evidently having some political functions. The Etruscan league of twelve city-states met annually at the Fanum, located in a place chosen as omphalos (sacred navel), the geographical and spiritual centre of the whole Etruscan nation. Each spring political and religious leaders from the cities would meet to discuss military campaigns and civic affairs and pray to their common gods. Chief amongst these was Voltumna (or Veltha), possibly state god of the Etruria.

Roman historian Livy mentioned the Fanum Voltumnae five times in his works and indicated "...apud Volsinios..." as the place where the shrine was located. Modern historians have been looking for the Fanum since at least the 15th century but the exact location of the shrine is still unknown, though it may have been in an area near modern Orvieto, believed by many to be the ancient Volsinii.  Livy describes the meetings that took place at the Fanum between Etruscan leaders. Livy refers in particular to a meeting in which two groups applied to assist the city of Veii in a war it was waging. The council's answer was no, because Veii had declared war without first notifying it. Livy also says that Roman merchants who travelled to a huge fair attached to the meeting acted as spies, reporting back on Etruscan affairs to authorities in the city-state of Rome. Livy was alone in mentioning the god Voltumna, whereas Marcus Terentius Varro indicated a god-prince of Etruria. The Latin elegiac poet Propertius writes of an Etruscan god taken to Rome from Velzna (the town of Orvieto).
That the Fanum was somewhere in central Italy in the area between Orvieto and Viterbo is probable enough, but as Livy gave no clue to its locality, and as no inscriptions have thrown light on the subject, at the current time it can be but pure conjecture to assign to it this or that particular site.

Hypotheses

Orvieto
The most credited hypothesis places the shrine in Orvieto. The Urbs Vetus of the Middle Ages is identified with the Etruscan Velzna by scholars, the Latin Volsinii, conquered by the Romans in 264 BC. Livy, Pliny, Florus, Horace, Metrodorus of Scepsis, all belonging to the 2nd century BC, clearly speak of ancient Volsinii, but never in relation to the Fanum Voltumnae. In the late 19th-century archaeologists uncovered parts of the walls and found large quantities of earthenware, and based on these findings in 1930s the archeologist Geralberto Buccolini set out the hypothesis that the Fanum was situated at the foot of Orvieto's tuff In particular, the Temple of Belvedere was discovered and identified as the Temple of Nortia.

In September 2006, Simonetta Stopponi, professor of Italic Archaeology and Etruscology at Macerata University (Italy), after extensive digs (begun in 2000 and financed by the Monte dei Paschi di Siena Bank, with ministerial permission) at a site near the hill town of Orvieto (esplanade Arcone, former Campo della Fiera, smallholding Giardino della Regina) announced that the site at the feet of the Umbrian town probably was the location of the Fanum Voltumnae. "It has all the characteristics of a very important shrine, and of that shrine in particular" she said.

Listing some of those characteristics, she mentioned "the scale of the construction, its intricate structure and layout, the presence of wells and fountains and the central temple building".

Structures of various periods have been identified, distributed over a very large area (a retaining wall in polygonal masonry, a paved street, etc.), and many fragments of architectural terracottas have been recovered (among which are some similar to those in Berlin), datable from Late Archaic period to Hellenistic times. Also supporting the claim that this is the Fanum Voltumnae is the fact that the area was used continuously for religious purposes right from the 6th century BC up to the 15th century. Roman temples were built on it in later centuries and the last church was erected there in the 12th century.

In November 2014, archaeologist Simonetta Stopponi announced finding a polychrome terracotta male head of an Etruscan god in the area of Orvieto. "The head is very nice and well kept," said Stopponi, "An important discovery as well as that of the temple" that measures . A main temple and a sacred way have also been excavated.

Bagnoregio
Some modern scholars have hypothesized that the location of Fanum Voltumnae was at Bagnoregio (probably on the hill of Civita di Bagnoregio), past possession of Orvieto and Etruscan walled town.

Tuscania
Before the discoveries in the Orvieto area, the archaeological site of Guado Cinto, a necropolis including the Tomb of the Queen near Tuscania, was one of the most credited locations of Fanum Voltumnae.

Viterbo
This hypothesis, presented in the 1950s by Mario Signorelli (1905–1990), an Italian music teacher, identified the sacred wood of the Etruscans in the peripheral areas of Viterbo named Riello and Macchia grande. This area was central to the sacred wood, protected by four guardian towns which prevented it from being disclosed to the profane. The four towns were: Ferente (i.e. Ferentium), Axia (i.e. Castel d'Asso), Vrcle (Orcla, the centre of today's Norchia), Luserna (i.e. Musarna). The works of Signorelli followed the writings of the fifteenth-century forger and friar of the Dominican order Annio da Viterbo (1432–1502), who devoted his life to collecting legends and traditions ascribed to the Etruscans, and to inventing documents to support his histories.

Viterbo's heraldic badges are surrounded by the letters FAVL (read as FAUL), which appear like a ciphered globe. It is unclear what they refer to, but some claim that they are the initials of the guardian towns and some others that they are in reference to the initial syllables of Fanum Voltumnae. The latter was affirmed in the nineteenth century by Francesco Orioli, who also surmised that the Viterbo Cathedral was built on the site of the Fanum, in the Roman settlement Castrum Herculis. Viterbo, inasmuch as it contains a church named Santa Maria in Volturna, may be considered as having some claims to the Fanum.

Montefiascone
Annio of Viterbo, in his 17 volumes of Antiquities (published in 1498) attributed the foundation of the Etruscan Fanum Voltumnae to the ancient population known as Falisci (allies of the Etruscans, along with Capenates, at the time of the wars between Rome and Veii, 406–396 BC). The town Montefiascone was named after them (Mons Faliscorum, that is, Mountain of the Falisci). The British explorer George Dennis, though without any documentary evidence, supported Montefiascone as the sacred site where the states of the Etruscan league met periodically to discuss military and political affairs and choose a lucumo (the equivalent of Pontifex Maximus).

Latera
In spring 1988, news was published that Fanum Voltumnae was at last discovered on the volcanic ridge of Lake Bolsena. The hill (633 m a.s.l.), known as Poggio Evangelista (commune of Latera), retains the ruins of a temple, visibly located on a strategic place, with a wide view over Umbria, Lazio and Tuscany (Berlingo and Timperi, 1995). It is likely a sacred Etruscan place of worship dating back to the 6th – 4th centuries BC.

Valentano
In 1976 and 1977, Danish excavations were carried out at Monte Becco (at 556 m a.s.l.), in the area of Valentano, near to the Lake Mezzano (ancient Lacus Statoniensis). Traces of the Etruscan presence, including walls, bronze tools, and roof tiles were found during the study mission. One of the tiles was found to be incised with all the characters of the Etruscan alphabet. This site has been also indicated as one of the possible locations of the Fanum.

Bolsena
This hypothesis is supported by Angelo Timperi, inspector and archeologist of Soprintendenza per i Beni Archeologici dell'Etruria Meridionale, with roles and responsibilities for the eastern side of Lake Bolsena and the archaeological area of Poggio Moscini in Bolsena. His idea is that Fanum Voltumnae was a large area centred on the ancient Etruscan, and later Roman town of Velzna, situated on the shore of Lacus Volsiniensis (modern Lake Bolsena). This conclusion is based on both archaeological and epigraphical discoveries, also supported by stratigraphic reconstructions and archival records.

San Lorenzo Nuovo
Another hypothesis suggests that the federal shrine of the Etruscans was located to the northern coast of Lake Bolsena, in a place known as Civita di Grotte di Castro, a plain area close to the church of San Giovanni in Val di Lago (currently in the commune of San Lorenzo Nuovo). This hypothesis (also supported by Luigi Catena) comes out of another study based on the so-called Rescritto di Spello (Rescript of Hispellum) issued by emperor Constantine I in a date between 333 and 337 AD to authorize the Umbrians' annual celebration:

This is the first document that allows one to situate the Fanum at Volsinii – or at least in the Volsiniese territory. It is said in the document that the annual Etruscan feast (concilium principum Etruriae) was celebrated near Volsinios, including games and combats of gladiators, and election of the federal sacerdos. The document dates 4th century AD, thus the geographical indication in it can only refer to Volsinii Novi, i.e. Bolsena, and not to Velzna (Latinized to Volsinii Veteres, currently Orvieto), the town the Romans had conquered and destroyed more than five centuries earlier. New light is being brought into this area by British and Danish studies. The sacred rescript, found in 1733, was claimed false by the Italian historian Ludovico Antonio Muratori in his Novus Thesaurus Veterum Inscriptionum (pp. 1791–1795).
New discoveries from ongoing excavations have been made in location "Alfina" and "Monte Landro" by a team coordinated by Adriano Maggiani (teacher of Etruscology and Italic Archaeology at Ca' Foscari University of Venice), which may shed new lights on Etruscan culture at San Lorenzo Nuovo [e.g. Maccarino's tomb and other Etruscan tombs at San Lorenzo Nuovo]. An Etruscan mirror exhibited in the British Museum was found in a tomb on the territory of San Lorenzo Nuovo.

Bisentina island
Within Lake Bolsena, the Bisentina island (commune of Capodimonte) is also regarded as a sacred isle of the Etruscans, possible site for the Fanum, and gate to the underground world of Agharti. A sanctuary located on an island not situated at the sea would have been accessible to priests and kings of the 12 cities (with their closest entourages), their protection being granted during the religious and political meetings by a handful of armed men.
An Italian television program Voyager (1 October 2003) supported this hypothesis, suggesting for the Etruscans a parallelism to the Incas populations, who had also chosen one of Lake Titicaca's islands as their omphalos.

Indeed, not only the Incas but, for the same reasons, various peoples have decided to erect their most eminent sanctuary on sacred islands: the Egyptians at Philae; the Greeks at Delos; the Germans at Helgoland in the North Sea and on the island of the goddess Nerthus, in the Baltic; the Celts at Gavrinis, near to the Breton coast in France, at Iona in Scotland, etc. This hypothesis finds a type of confirmation in the poem the Theogony, by the Greek oral poet Hesiod (8th–7th century BC) : "They ruled over the famous Tyrenians, very far off in a recess of the holy islands".

Pitigliano
In Geografia sacra, Giovanni Feo presents his studies conducted over the Fiora River valley, in the comune of Pitigliano. A set of megalithic relics with astronomic functions was found out here, along with engraved rocky structures for cultural use. Such discoveries testify of the existence of a sacred area, originally developed by a pre-etruscan civilization settled down near to Lake Bolsena and later elected by the Etruscans as their religious centre. Giovanni Feo also pointed out the borders of this sacred area, which delimited the Fanum, divided into four parts centred around the intersection point between the earth and heaven gods.

Farnese
In the commune of Farnese, deep in the Selva del Lamone, location Voltone is assumed to get its name from the sacred temple dedicated to Voltumna. The Voltone is surrounded by numerous archaeological sites, such as Sovana, Castro, Vulci, and Tarquinia, which testify of the culture of the Etruscans.

Tarquinia
According to Alberto Palmucci, the Fanum Voltumnae could be the renowned temple of Ara della Regina, the biggest temple of Etruria, consecrated to Tinia, god of the sky and the highest god in Etruscan mythology (equivalent to the Roman Jupiter and the Greek Zeus).
The only representation of this god is one on a mirror, showing him attending the lesson in divination (haruspicy) given, in Tarquinia, to the culture hero Tarchon by prophet Tages. Greek historian Strabo supports that symbols of Etruscan federal power were transferred to Rome from Tarquinia.

In the archaeological museum of Tarquinia is an Etruscan vessel (early seventh century BC) with a dedication to the god Vertun (Latin: Vertumnus, Voltumna). It comes from the nearly Etruscan cemetery.

References

Sources

Coarelli Filippo, "Il rescritto di Spello e il santuario 'etnico' degli umbri, Umbria Cristiana. Dalla Diffusione del culto al culto dei santi (secc. iv–x)," Atti del xv Congresso internazionale di studi sull’alto medioevo, Spoleto 23–28 October 2000, Spoleto, 2001, 737–747.

Palmucci Alberto, "Virgilio, Erodoto, il DNA e l'origine degli Etruschi (Corito Tarquinia)". "Aufidus" (Dipartimento di Scienze dell'Antichità dell'Università di Bari; Dipartimento di Studi del Mondo Antico dell'Università di Roma Tre", 2007, nr. 62-63, p. 116, ss.
Pelosi Tonino, Fortunati Fabio, Ipotesi sul "Fanum Voltumnae"… l’ultimo, grande mistero degli Etruschi, Bolsena, 1998.

Archaeology of Italy
Etruscan religion